Vernon Lawrence Walter Thomas (27 August 1914 – 17 November 1957) was a New Zealand wrestler who won a silver medal at the 1938 British Empire Games.

Biography
Born on 27 August 1914, Thomas was the son of Rubena Birss and her husband Walter Samuel Thomas.

Thomas won four New Zealand national amateur wrestling titles: the welterweight title in 1935, 1936, and 1938; and the lightweight championship in 1937. At the 1938 British Empire Games in Sydney, he won the silver medal in the men's lightweight division.

Thomas died on 17 November 1957, and his ashes were buried in Karori Cemetery, Wellington.

References

1914 births
1957 deaths
Commonwealth Games silver medallists for New Zealand
Wrestlers at the 1938 British Empire Games
New Zealand male sport wrestlers
Commonwealth Games medallists in wrestling
Burials at Karori Cemetery
Medallists at the 1938 British Empire Games